The Good Fellows is a 1943 American comedy film directed by Jo Graham and written by Hugh Wedlock Jr. and Howard Snyder. The film stars Cecil Kellaway, Helen Walker, Mabel Paige, James Brown, Patti Hale and Kathleen Lockhart. The film was released on August 11, 1943, by Paramount Pictures.

Plot

Jim Hilton devotes too much time to his lodge membership and too little to his real-estate business. He lets daughter Ethel handle a potential purchase of the Draytons' riverfront property, whereupon she develops a romantic interest in the Draytons' son, Tom.

Jim inadvertently commits money he doesn't have to his lodge's hosting a convention. At dinner, he persuades Mr. Drayton to join the lodge and pay a $2,000 admittance fee, then uses the money for his own purposes. The family runs out of patience with Jim's ways, and only daughter Sprat's disappearance brings him to his senses, at least temporarily.

Cast
Cecil Kellaway as Jim Hilton
Helen Walker as Ethel Hilton
Mabel Paige as Miss Kent
James Brown as Tom Drayton
Patti Hale as Sprat 
Kathleen Lockhart as Mary Hilton
Douglas Wood as John Drayton
Norma Varden as Mrs. Drayton
Olin Howland as Reynolds
Tom Fadden as Harvey
William B. Davidson as Blake

References

External links
 

1943 films
Paramount Pictures films
American comedy films
1943 comedy films
American black-and-white films
1940s English-language films
Films directed by Jo Graham
1940s American films